Praekogia is an extinct genus of cetacean in the family Kogiidae that lived during the Miocene, containing one species: P. cedrosensis. Fossils have been found in Mexico (Baja California).

References 

Cetaceans
Miocene extinctions
Miocene first appearances
Neogene Mexico
Fossils of Mexico
Fossil taxa described in 1973